Oliver Laux (born March 26, 1990) is a German footballer who plays for FC Gießen.

External links

 

1990 births
Living people
German footballers
TuS Koblenz players
SC Fortuna Köln players
3. Liga players
Association football central defenders